New Market Township may refer to:

New Market Township, Scott County, Minnesota
New Market Township, Randolph County, North Carolina
New Market Township, Highland County, Ohio

See also

 New Market (disambiguation)

Township name disambiguation pages